The 35th Army Corps was an army corps of the French Army.

It was created on 27/08/1914 as the 6th Group of Infantry Divisions of the Réserve. On 15 December 1914 it was redesignated the 35th Army Corps. Amongst others it fought in the Battle of the Somme.

Its commanders included:
 12/12/1914:  General Charles Ebener
 29/04/1916:  Général Charles Jacquot

Composition 
 37th Infantry Division from January 1915 to January 1916
 53rd Infantry Division from January 1916 to November 1918
 61st Infantry Division from January 1915 to July 1917
 121st Infantry Division from January 1916 to November 1918

Infantry regiments
 68th Territorial Infantry Regiment from June 1915 to novembre 1918
 69th Territorial Infantry Régiment from June 1915 to June 1918 (dissolution)
 1st Bataillon de Chasseurs à Pied Territoriaux from June 1915 to May 1916
 4th Bataillon de Chasseurs à Pied Territoriaux from June 1915 to May 1916

References and source

035
Military units and formations established in 1914
Corps of France in World War I